In decision theory and estimation theory, Stein's example (also known as Stein's phenomenon or Stein's paradox) is the observation that when three or more parameters are estimated simultaneously, there exist combined estimators more accurate on average (that is, having lower expected mean squared error) than any method that handles the parameters separately. It is named after Charles Stein of Stanford University, who discovered the phenomenon in 1955.

An intuitive explanation is that optimizing for the mean-squared error of a combined estimator is not the same as optimizing for the errors of separate estimators of the individual parameters. In practical terms, if the combined error is in fact of interest, then a combined estimator should be used, even if the underlying parameters are independent. If one is instead interested in estimating an individual parameter, then using a combined estimator does not help and is in fact worse.

Formal statement 
The following is the simplest form of the paradox, the special case in which the number of observations is equal to the number of parameters to be estimated. Let  be a vector consisting of  unknown parameters. To estimate these parameters, a single measurement  is performed for each parameter , resulting in a vector  of length .  Suppose the measurements are known to be independent, Gaussian random variables, with mean  and variance 1, i.e., . Thus, each parameter is estimated using a single noisy measurement, and each measurement is equally inaccurate.

Under these conditions, it is intuitive and common to use each measurement as an estimate of its corresponding parameter. The quality of such an estimator is measured by its risk function. Surprisingly, it turns out that the "ordinary" decision rule is suboptimal (inadmissible) in terms of mean squared error when .

The estimators of Stein's paradox are, for a given , better than the "ordinary" decision rule  for some  but necessarily worse for others. It is only on average that they are better. An estimator is said to be admissible if no other estimator dominates it, otherwise it is inadmissible. Thus, Stein's example can be simply stated as follows: The "ordinary" decision rule of the mean of a multivariate Gaussian distribution is inadmissible under mean squared error risk.

Many simple, practical estimators achieve better performance than the "ordinary" decision rule. For a sketch of the proof of this result, see Proof of Stein's example. An alternative proof is due to Larry Brown: he proved that the ordinary estimator for an -dimensional multivariate normal mean vector is admissible if and only if the  -dimensional Brownian motion is recurrent.

An intuitive explanation 
The trick of the Stein estimator, and others that yield the Stein paradox, is that they adjust the shift in such a way that there is always (for any  vector) at least one  whose mean square error is improved, and its improvement more than compensates for any degradation in mean square error that might occur for another . The trouble is that, without knowing , you don't know which of the  mean square errors are improved, so you can't use the Stein estimator only for those parameters.

An example of the above setting occurs in channel estimation in telecommunications, for instance, because different factors affect overall channel performance.

Implications 
Stein's example is surprising, since the "ordinary" decision rule is intuitive and commonly used. In fact, numerous methods for estimator construction, including maximum likelihood estimation, best linear unbiased estimation, least squares estimation and optimal equivariant estimation, all result in the "ordinary" estimator. Yet, as discussed above, this estimator is suboptimal.

Example 
To demonstrate the unintuitive nature of Stein's example, consider the following real-world example. Suppose we are to estimate three unrelated parameters, such as the US wheat yield for 1993, the number of spectators at the Wimbledon tennis tournament in 2001, and the weight of a randomly chosen candy bar from the supermarket. Suppose we have independent Gaussian measurements of each of these quantities. Stein's example now tells us that we can get a better estimate (on average) for the vector of three parameters by simultaneously using the three unrelated measurements.

At first sight it appears that somehow we get a better estimator for US wheat yield by measuring some other unrelated statistics such as the number of spectators at Wimbledon and the weight of a candy bar. However, we have not obtained a better estimator for US wheat yield by itself, but we have produced an estimator for the vector of the means of all three random variables, which has a reduced total risk.  This occurs because the cost of a bad estimate in one component of the vector is compensated by a better estimate in another component.  Also, a specific set of the three estimated mean values obtained with the new estimator will not necessarily be better than the ordinary set (the measured values). It is only on average that the new estimator is better.

Sketched proof 

The risk function of the decision rule  is

Now consider the decision rule

where . The risk function is

We may simplify the middle term by considering a general "well-behaved" function  and using integration by parts. For , for any continuously differentiable  growing sufficiently slowly for large  we have:

Therefore,

(This result is known as Stein's lemma.) Now, we choose

If  met the "well-behaved" condition (it doesn't, but this can be remedied—see below), we would have

and so

Then returning to the risk function of :

which of course satisfies  making  an inadmissible decision rule.

It remains to justify the use of

However, the function

is continuously differentiable, and after following the algebra through and letting , one obtains the same result.

See also 
 James–Stein estimator

Notes

References 
 
 
 

Estimation theory
Mathematical examples
Statistical paradoxes